Dragon Capital is a Ukrainian investment management company founded by Czech businessman  and partners in 2000 in Kyiv. It works in the sphere of financial services; provides a full range of investment banking and brokerage services, private investment, asset management for institutional, corporate and private clients.

In 2016-2020, Dragon Capital, together with its foreign partners, invested more than $600 million in real estate, of which more than $500 million are Kyiv and Kyiv region. The investment partner, among others, is the American financier, stock market investor George Soros.

The company sells war bonds of Ukraine.

History 
The company was founded by Tomas Fiala in cooperation with partners in 2000 in Kyiv.

In 2007-2017, Goldman Sachs, one of the world's largest banks, owned a minority stake in Dragon Capital. In 2017 Dragon Capital bought back shares from Goldman Sachs although the latter acquired 25% stake in New Ukraine PE Holding Limited.

In 2008, Dragon Capital, together with East Capital Bering Ukraine Fund, acquired 70% of Chumak's (food company) shares, but sold its stake in 2019.

In April 2017, the Security Service of Ukraine conducted a search at the company office. They were looking for Russian Stakhanovets software on employees' computers. Then, former Prime Minister Volodymyr Groysman backed the company.

In 2017–2019, it acquired a number of different commercial properties: Victoria Gardens shopping center (Lviv), Sky Park shopping mall (Vinnytsia), Eco Tower (Zaporizhia) business center, Horizon Park Business Center (Kyiv), Aladdin shopping mall (Kyiv), logistics centre Arctic (Kyiv), Smart Plaza Obolon shopping mall (Kyiv), West Gate Logistic (logistics complex).

In 2019, the company acquired a minority stake in Ciklum (IT company).

In October 2019, it indirectly acquired the assets of Kyivska Rus Bank, namely an office building.

In December 2019, the company entered into an agreement to acquire 100% of Idea Bank and New Finance Service's shares for UAH 1.368 billion, but at the end of June 2020 terminated the agreement.

June 24, 2020 - Dragon Capital made a deal to acquire the Falby pharmaceutical logistics complex.

In 2020, Dragon Capital acquired a 6 floors building for the Kyiv School of Economics.

September 22, 2020 - the company announced the construction of the E40 Industrial Park on the 27th kilometer of the Zhytomyr highway.

December 3, 2020 - Dragon Capital bought the Industrial Park in Riasne-2.

In 2021, Dragon Capital New Ukraine Fund LP, managed by Dragon Capital, has completed an agreement to acquire a controlling stake in Treeum, which includes the financial portals Finance.ua and Minfin.com.ua.

In April 2021, Dragon Capital acquired UnexBank.

In May 2021 owner Olena Prytula sold 100% of the corporate rights of Ukrainian online newspaper Ukrayinska Pravda to Dragon Capital. The parties agreed that the editorial policy of the newspaper would remain unchanged. According to Dragon Capital the investment was "another step towards supporting free media and freedom of speech in Ukraine."

Europe Virgin Fund 
In July 2010, Dragon Capital established a regional private equity fund, Europe Virgin Fund, which operates assets in Ukraine, Moldova and Belarus. The fund has already attracted investments from the EBRD, Swiss Investment Fund for Emerging Markets, Black Sea Trade and Development Bank, and other investors. During its existence, the Fund has invested in a number of pharmaceutical companies (Sperco Ukraine), consumer goods (Tissico Limited), marketing (PRIME Group), private security (VENBEST Group), etc.

Dragon Capital New Ukraine Fund 
The fund was established in November 2015. Its anchor investors are Dragon Capital and the Ukrainian Redevelopment Fund, which is managed by Soros Fund Management. The fund was created to invest in the Ukrainian economy and provide financial and managerial support to companies to increase efficiency, modernize technology and ensure long-term growth.

New Ukraine PE Holding, which is part of the Dragon Capital group of companies and whose main shareholder is the Dragon Capital New Ukraine Fund, has completed the acquisition of the Prime and Eurasia business centers at PJSC BTA BANK. BC "Eurasia" and BC "Prime" - business centers of class A, located in the business center of Kyiv on the street. Zhylyanska. Their total area is 33,423 and 9,140,000 m2, respectively. "By entering the office real estate sector, we have diversified our investments and demonstrated faith in the further resumption of business activity in Ukraine," said Tomasz Fiala, CEO of Dragon Capital.

NV 
In 2014, a weekly socio-political print magazine NV was created and subsequently a Ukrainian-Russian news website was launched too. In 2017, Dragon Capital acquired Radio Era which became the basis for newly launched Radio NV.

References 

Financial services companies established in 2000
Investment management companies of Ukraine